The Leading Point Light was an unusual lighthouse which displayed the rear light to the Brewerton Channel Range. It was eventually superseded by an iron tower on the same foundation.

History
This light was built in 1868, along with the Hawkins Point Light, to provide range lights marking the Brewerton Channel, excavated in the 1850s to provide a fixed deepwater channel into Baltimore Harbor. In form, it was like no other lighthouse in the area, a brick house with a short tower holding the lantern surmounted with a tall pole supporting a large ball, to be used as a daymark.

In 1924 both lights in this range were torn down and replaced with skeleton towers, which remain in use.

References

Brewerton Range Front Light, from the Chesapeake Chapter of the United States Lighthouse Society

External links

1868 establishments in Maryland
Buildings and structures demolished in 1924
Hawkins Point, Baltimore
Lighthouses completed in 1868
Lighthouses completed in 1924
Lighthouses in the Chesapeake Bay
Lighthouses in Baltimore